Voice box may refer to:
 The larynx (plural larynges), colloquially known as the voice box, an organ in the neck of land vertebrates involved in protection of the trachea and (in some of them) sound production and vibration of the larynx
 A mechanical larynx, used by people who have lost their voice box due to disease or smoking-associated ailments of the mouth and the voice